Raghunathpur Government Polytechnic is a government polytechnic located in Sarbari More, Purulia district, West Bengal, India.

About college
This polytechnic is affiliated to the West Bengal State Council of Technical Education, and recognized by AICTE, New Delhi. This polytechnic offers diploma courses in Electrical, Computer Science & Technology, and Mechanical Engineering.

See also

References

External links
Official website WBSCTE
Raghunathpur Government Polytechnic

Universities and colleges in Purulia district
Technical universities and colleges in West Bengal
2016 establishments in West Bengal
Educational institutions established in 2016